Killing Mobius (2005) is the fifth studio full-length album by DJ? Acucrack.

Track listing
 "Stop All Sounds" (Jason Novak) – 2:08
 "Loudmouth" (Novak) – 5:03
 "All Up in My Face" (Novak) – 3:57
 "Slowly Regaining Consciousness" (Novak) – 3:54
 "Temple of the Mourning Star" (Novak) – 5:34
 "Gangland II" (Novak) – 5:41
 "Pulling Birds in a Crisis Situation" (Novak) – 4:53
 "Send More Paramedics" (Novak) – 5:07
 "Behind the Wheel" (Novak) – 5:54
 "Recalx" (Novak) – 5:02
 "Thalidomide" (Novak) – 6:07
 "Sniper Code (MC Geist Remix)" (Novak) – 5:29
 "So to Speak (Sascha KMFDM Remix) (Novak/Toni Halliday) – 4:00

Personnel
 Jason Novak
 Jamie Duffy
 Kelly Britton – Vocals (11)
 MC Geist – Remixing (12)
 Sascha Konietzko – Remixing (13)
 Toni Halliday – Vocals (13)

References

2005 albums
DJ? Acucrack albums